Carina "Laura" Felipe Silva (born 3 March 1998) is a Uruguayan footballer who plays as a right back for Argentine side Club Atlético River Plate and the Uruguay women's national team.

International career
Felipe represented Uruguay at the 2012 South American U-17 Women's Championship and the 2012 FIFA U-17 Women's World Cup. She made her senior debut on 11 September 2014. She played in two Copa América Femenina editions (2014 and 2018).

References

External links

1998 births
Living people
Footballers from Montevideo
Uruguayan women's footballers
Women's association football fullbacks
Women's association football midfielders
Club Nacional de Football players
Club Atlético River Plate (women) players
Uruguay women's international footballers
Afro-Uruguayan
Uruguayan expatriate women's footballers
Uruguayan expatriate sportspeople in Argentina
Expatriate women's footballers in Argentina